Brachyleptura circumdata is a species of beetle in the family Cerambycidae. It was described by Olivier in 1795. The beetle is noted as being smaller than other members of its genus at 7-10mm. As larvae, they feed upon spruce and possibly pine. They are most active in June-July.

References

Lepturinae
Beetles described in 1795